The 2004–05 season of the Lebanese Premier League was the 44th season of Top-Flight Professional League Football (soccer) in Lebanon. This season featured 11 clubs once more from across the nation. Two of the competing teams were eligible for qualifying for international competitions(AFC Cup for 1st Position and FA Cup Winners while 2nd and 3rd enter the Arab Champions League) while the bottom 3 would be relegated to make way for 2 teams from the 2004–05 Second Division for 2005–06 season. This Due to the league being reduced to 10 teams for the 2005–06 season.

Final table

Top scorers

Correct as of 28 June 2005.

References

External links
Goalzz.com
Rec.Sports.Soccer.Statistics.Foundation
Lebanese Football.com

Leb
2004–05 in Lebanese football
Lebanese Premier League seasons
2004–05 Lebanese Premier League